In mathematics, the multiplicity of a member of a multiset is the number of times it appears in the multiset.  For example, the number of times a given polynomial has a root at a given point is the multiplicity of that root.

The notion of multiplicity is important to be able to count correctly without specifying exceptions (for example, double roots counted twice).  Hence the expression, "counted with multiplicity".

If multiplicity is ignored, this may be emphasized by counting the number of distinct elements, as in "the number of distinct roots". However, whenever a set (as opposed to multiset) is formed, multiplicity is automatically ignored, without requiring use of the term "distinct".

Multiplicity of a prime factor

In prime factorization, the multiplicity of a prime factor is its -adic valuation. For example, the prime factorization of the integer  is

 

Thus,  has four prime factors allowing for multiplicities, but only three distinct prime factors.

Multiplicity of a root of a polynomial

If , then a is called a simple root. If , then  is called a multiple root.

This means that 1 is a root of multiplicity 2, and −4 is a simple root (of multiplicity 1). The multiplicity of a root is the number of occurrences of this root in the complete factorization of the polynomial, by means of the fundamental theorem of algebra.

The discriminant of a polynomial is zero if and only if the polynomial has a multiple root.

Behavior of a polynomial function near a multiple root 

The graph of a polynomial function f touches the x-axis at the real roots of the polynomial. The graph is tangent to it at the multiple roots of f and not tangent at the simple roots. The graph crosses the x-axis at roots of odd multiplicity and does not cross it at roots of even multiplicity.

A non-zero polynomial function is everywhere non-negative if and only if all its roots have even multiplicity and there exists an  such that .

Multiplicity of a solution of a nonlinear system of equations

For an equation  with a single variable solution , the multiplicity is  if

 and 

The dimension of this Macaulay dual space is the multiplicity of the solution  to the equation . The Macaulay dual space forms the multiplicity structure of the system at the solution.

is of multiplicity 3 because the Macaualy dual space 

is of dimension 3, where  denotes the differential functional  applied on a function at the point .

The multiplicity is always finite if the solution is isolated, is perturbation invariant in the sense that a -fold solution becomes a cluster of solutions with a combined multiplicity  under perturbation in complex spaces, and is identical to the intersection multiplicity on polynomial systems.

Intersection multiplicity

In algebraic geometry, the intersection of two sub-varieties of an algebraic variety is a finite union of irreducible varieties. To each component of such an intersection is attached an intersection multiplicity. This notion is local in the sense that it may be defined by looking at what occurs in a neighborhood of any generic point of this component. It follows that without loss of generality, we may consider, in order to define the intersection multiplicity, the intersection of two affines varieties (sub-varieties of an affine space).

Thus, given two affine varieties V1 and V2, consider an irreducible component W of the intersection of V1 and V2. Let d be the dimension of W, and P be any generic point of W. The intersection of W with d hyperplanes in general position passing through P has an irreducible component that is reduced to the single point P. Therefore, the local ring at this component of the coordinate ring of the intersection has only one prime ideal, and is therefore an Artinian ring. This ring is thus a finite dimensional vector space over the ground field. Its dimension is the intersection multiplicity of V1 and V2 at W.

This definition allows us to state Bézout's theorem and its generalizations precisely.

This definition generalizes the multiplicity of a root of a polynomial in the following way. The roots of a polynomial f are points on the affine line, which are the components of the algebraic set defined by the polynomial. The coordinate ring of this affine set is  where K is an algebraically closed field containing the coefficients of f. If  is the factorization of f, then the local ring of R at the prime ideal  is  This is a vector space over K, which has the multiplicity  of the root as a dimension.

This definition of intersection multiplicity, which is essentially due to Jean-Pierre Serre in his book Local Algebra, works only for the set theoretic components (also called isolated components) of the intersection, not for the embedded components. Theories have been developed for handling the embedded case (see Intersection theory for details).

In complex analysis
Let z0 be a root of a holomorphic function f, and let n be the least positive integer such that, the nth derivative of f evaluated at z0 differs from zero. Then the power series of f about z0 begins with the nth term, and f is said to have a root of multiplicity (or “order”) n. If n = 1, the root is called a simple root.

We can also define the multiplicity of the zeroes and poles of a meromorphic function. If we have a meromorphic function  take the Taylor expansions of g and h about a point z0, and find the first non-zero term in each (denote the order of the terms m and n respectively) then if m = n, then the point has non-zero value. If  then the point is a zero of multiplicity  If , then the point has a pole of multiplicity

References

Krantz, S. G. Handbook of Complex Variables. Boston, MA: Birkhäuser, 1999. .

Set theory
Mathematical analysis